John William Hermann (born October 17, 1933) is a former American football player and coach.  Hermann played running back, tight end, and defensive back for coach Red Sanders at UCLA from 1953 to 1955. He was a member of the Bruins team that played in the 1954 Rose Bowl and was named that year's FWAA & UPI National Champions.

Hermann was drafted by the New York Giants in the 10th round (117th overall) of the 1956 NFL Draft. He played two games for the Giants before being cut. He signed two weeks later by the Baltimore Colts and finished the year with them.

In 1959, Hermann joined the UCLA coaching staff as the head coach of the freshman football team. He also coached the Bruins quarterbacks, tight ends, and running backs until the end of the 1964 season when he was dismissed by incoming head coach Tommy Prothro. John then became head coach of Compton College (1965) before joining the coaching staff at Los Angeles State College in 1966.  He became head coach of the Diablos in 1967 and athletic director in 1970.

References

1933 births
Living people
American football defensive backs
American football running backs
American football tight ends
Baltimore Colts players
New York Giants players
UCLA Bruins football coaches
UCLA Bruins football players
People from San Fernando, California
Players of American football from California
Sportspeople from Los Angeles County, California